The Bubble is a 2001 Greek film. The film is directed by Nikos Perakis and stars Maria Solomou and Alexis Georgoulis. The film took part in the Thessaloniki Film Festival.

Plot summary
Makis Alexis Georgoulis, a man with difficulties in the stock market, falls for Roula (Maria Solomou), who is the mistress of a big tycoon Manolas (Ilias Logothetis), which Makis has invested in. Makis becomes witness to an assassination gone wrong. The police are after him thinking he is the shooter but the real assassin is after Makis to recruit him to his terrorist beliefs. The only comfort Makis can find is Roula who follows him on his deadly adventure.

Cast
Alexis Georgoulis as Makis
Maria Solomou as Roula
Yannis Bostantzoglou as Manolas
Ilias Logothetis as Spartacos

Sources

 Page on The Bubble on the director's homepage.
 The Chicago Reader.
 Review by Nestoras Poulakos.

Further reading
 Film Festival 2002

External links

I Phouska (Cine)

2001 films
2000s Greek-language films
Greek thriller films
Films directed by Nikos Perakis
2001 thriller films